Prosper Kuka Donkor (born 16 June 1994) is a Ghanaian footballer who last played for Rayon Sports F.C.

Career
Donkor began his youth playing career at Hearts of Lion in the Tema Colts League before joining division 1 club, Bechem United F.C. in 2016/17.

Dreams FC
On 3 July 2015 Donkor joined Ghanaian giants Dreams FC on a two-year contract.

Rayon Sports
On 8 August 2018, Donkor signed at Rwanda National Football League club Rayon Sports F.C.

Honours
Rwanda National Football League 2018-2019: 1
Agaciro Cup 2018-2019: 1

References

External links
 

1994 births
Living people
Ghanaian footballers
Ghanaian expatriate footballers
Association football midfielders
Bechem United FC players
Rayon Sports F.C. players
Ghana Premier League players
Ghanaian expatriate sportspeople in Rwanda
Expatriate footballers in Rwanda
Footballers from Accra